Gay's the Word is a musical with book and music by Ivor Novello and lyrics by Alan Melville.  The musical is a backstage comedy that parodies Novello's own swashbuckling Ruritanian romance plots. The story centres on Gay Daventry, a bankrupt operetta producer who opens a drama school at her country house. This also turns out to be unsuccessful, but it leads to a theatrical comeback for Gay.

The musical premiered at the Palace Theatre, Manchester, England, on 17 October 1950.  It transferred to the Saville Theatre in London, opening there on 16 February 1951, where it ran for 504 performances and starred Cicely Courtneidge as Gay, Lizbeth Webb as Linda, and Thorley Walters.  While it embraced the new style of musical theatre from America, it also contained traditional British humour for Courtneidge and glamorous soprano solos for Webb.  The British Theatre Guide concludes: "The musical was never that good and without [Courtneidge] it would most certainly have failed. But with her, thanks to her indefatigable vitality, the show was a hit." This was Ivor Novello's last musical, and he died a month after it opened at age 58.

The musical was revived in 2012 at the Finborough Theatre, London, with a book revised by Richard Stirling, directed and choreographed by Stewart Nicholls.

Synopsis
Act 1
Gay Daventry, a producer and stage star, goes bankrupt when her new London operetta, similar to a Ruritanian Ivor Novello musical, is a disappointing failure.  She agrees with the show's ingénue, Linda, to open a drama school with Linda's money at Gay's country house in Folkestone.  She teaches her students that "vitality" is the secret to success.  Meanwhile, two smugglers hope to use the school as a front for their illegal activities.

Act 2 
At the Town Hall, the end-of-term show is to be performed, and Gay must go on stage as a Greek dancer, because the dance teacher of the school has resigned.  The school is failing financially, and Gay disguises herself as an auctioneer, to sell off the contents of her basement; and one of the items up for bid is a trunk that turns out to conceal the smugglers' goods.  Finally Gay, Linda and her boyfriend return to the professional stage with their students in a hit show.

Musical numbers
Ruritania
Guards of the Parade
Bees are Buzzin'
An Englishman in Love
Everything Reminds Me of You
Father Thames
Finder, Please Return
Gaiety Glad
If Only He'd Looked My Way
It's Bound To Be Right On the Night
Matter of Minutes
On Such A Night As This
Vitality
Sweet Thames

References

External links
 Gay's the Word — The Guide to Musical Theatre
Information about Novello musicals at Record Cabinet

1950 musicals
West End musicals
Musicals by Ivor Novello
British musicals